Epepeotes elongatus is a species of beetle in the family Cerambycidae. It was described by Karl-Ernst Hüdepohl in 1990. It is known from Malaysia.

References

elongatus
Beetles described in 1990